Wittrockiella is a genus of green algae in the family Pithophoraceae. This genus was first described by Nordal Wille in 1909. 

The genus name is for Veit Brecher Wittrock, a Swedish botanist (1839-1914).

Species 
Species in this genus include:

 Wittrockiella lyallii
 Wittrockiella salina

References

Cladophorales genera
Pithophoraceae